Being Respectable is a 1924 American drama film directed by Phil Rosen and written by Dorothy Farnum. The film stars Marie Prevost, Monte Blue, Louise Fazenda, Irene Rich, Theodore von Eltz and Frank Currier. The film was released by Warner Bros. on July 1, 1924.

Plot
Charles Carpenter is obliged to marry Suzanne, with pressure from his wealthy and respectable family, although he is in love with young Valerie Winship. Years later, when Valerie is back in town, they renew the affair and Carpenter plans to leave his wife and child for her, but in the end he yields to family duty and respectability.

Cast    
Marie Prevost as Valerie Winship 
Monte Blue as Charles Carpenter
Louise Fazenda as Deborah Carpenter
Irene Rich as Suzanne Schuyler
Theodore von Eltz as Stephen O'Connell
Frank Currier as Darius Carpenter
Eulalie Jensen as Louise Carpenter
Lila Leslie as Mrs. Winship
Sidney Bracey as Philip Deaby
Charles K. French as Mr. Beasley

Reception 
Being Respectable opened with mixed reviews from The New York Times. The New York Times Screen review characterized it as "only mildly interesting in parts, and frequently disappointing.".

References

External links
 

1924 films
1920s English-language films
Silent American drama films
1924 drama films
Warner Bros. films
Films directed by Phil Rosen
American silent feature films
American black-and-white films
1920s American films